Pizza Tower is a 2023 platform game created by the indie developer Tour De Pizza and released for Windows and Steam Deck exclusively through the Steam distribution platform. The game follows pizza chef Peppino Spaghetti as he traverses the titular tower to save his pizzeria.

The gameplay centers around increasing score, maintaining combos, gathering collectibles, and moving fast, with a variety of maneuvers and attacks to do so. At the end of each level, the player activates an escape sequence in which they must return to the beginning of the level while timed. Unlike most other platform games, the player does not have health or lives in regular gameplay, and there are no traditional game difficulty levels; rather, the difficulty of most levels depends on what the player chooses to achieve.

Pizza Tower design takes heavy inspiration from entertainment during the 1990s, especially the fourth generation of video game consoles. The game's elements and mechanics are inspired by the Wario Land, Jazz Jackrabbit, Earthworm Jim, Sonic the Hedgehog, and Metroid video game series, while its visual style has been compared to cartoons such as SpongeBob SquarePants, The Ren & Stimpy Show, Ed, Edd n Eddy, and Courage the Cowardly Dog, as well as early Microsoft Paint graphics.

Pizza Tower was released on January 26, 2023, to positive reception from critics, who praised its gameplay, aesthetics, music, humor, and similarities to the Wario Land series.

Gameplay 

Pizza Tower is a platform game in which the player controls Peppino Spaghetti as he traverses through each floor of a tower. The tower has five floors, each of which contains four levels and a boss (except Floor 5, which instead has three levels and a boss). In each level, there are five trapped Toppins (small creatures resembling pizza toppings) that the player can rescue for points and money, which is used to unlock boss stages. Each level has a secret treasure, locked behind a door that can only be opened by the janitor Gerome, who the player must collect and bring to the door. Most levels also feature three secret rooms, short challenges which give the player additional points and add to the level's completion.

To defeat enemies, Peppino can Body Slam from above (which can also destroy obstacles) or perform a Grab Dash to hold the enemy and throw them as a projectile. Like Wario Land 4s Dash Attack, Peppino can do a Mach Run if he runs for long enough, which greatly increases his speed and allows him to run up walls, defeat and stagger enemies, and destroy most blocks by running into them. While in this state, Peppino can also do a Super Jump, similar to a Shinespark in Super Metroid, where he vaults straight up, destroying any obstacles in his path until he hits a ceiling or dashes out of it. There are other moves not featured in the tutorial, like the Parry, which is performed by taunting just as an attack hits Peppino. The game also features transformations, power-ups that change Peppino's capabilities and game mechanics, many of which are limited to certain levels. These include Knight, allowing the player to damage on contact and slide on slopes; Pepper Pizza, providing invincibility and levitation; and Shotgun, adding ranged attacks and the ability to break certain blocks. In some levels, supporting characters Gustavo and Brick are playable, with their own moveset that is similar to Peppino's but allows for longer-range attacks and double jumps.

Defeating an enemy begins a combo, which increases with every enemy defeated. The combo is timed and ends within approximately 7 seconds; to maintain the combo, the player must defeat more enemies or pick up collectibles to increase their score, which pushes the timer back. Taking damage does not hurt the player, but rather lowers the player's score and tightens their window to continue the combo and complete timed objectives. The only levels where this does not apply are boss battles, where Peppino has a health bar and can be killed.

At the end of each level is a Pillar John, which the player must destroy. When he is destroyed, the "Pizza Time" phase starts, in which the player must return to the level's entrance to escape before a timer runs out. During this phase, certain areas of the level become blocked off or unlocked, and more enemies spawn. After beating a level once (or completing the game's tutorial quick enough), an optional "2nd Lap" will become available near the entrance, which returns the player to the Pillar John and increases their score upon successful completion. Should the timer run out, Pizzaface will arrive to chase the player through the stage, killing them and forcing the player out of the level should he make contact with the player. However, the timer running out does not mean the level cannot be completed, and Pizzaface can still be outran.

After completing each level, the player is given a ranking based on their score and performance: D, C, B, A, and S ranks are based on the player's score—D for an extremely low score and S for acquiring almost all the points in a level—while P rank can only be acquired if the player collects enough points for an S rank, and completes the 2nd Lap, all while maintaining a single uninterrupted combo. The player is also awarded money for finding Toppins in the level, which is used to unlock boss stages. For boss battles, ranks are determined by the number of times the player took damage: D for over nine times and P for not taking any damage. Additional unlockables, such as palette swap outfits for Peppino, are acquired through achievements or certain actions.

Synopsis 
Peppino Spaghetti is the owner of Peppino Pizza, a struggling pizzeria. One day, Peppino is approached by Pizzaface; a sinister, floating pizza pie with a living face made of pizza toppings. Pizzaface explains his plan in which, using a tower erected next to the pizzeria, he will vaporize Peppino Pizza with a nuclear laser from atop the tower. Frightened and angered at the prospect of his business being under threat, Peppino sets out to ascend the tower and defeat Pizzaface to save his pizzeria.

Peppino traverses through the tower's floors, breaking the Pillar John, a large moai-like being who acts as the tower's support columns, at the end of each level to weaken the tower. Peppino is assisted by fellow chef Gustavo, Gustavo's rival-turned-pet rat Brick, tower janitor (and Pillar John's younger brother) Gerome, and greedy salesman Mr. Stick. Peppino also battles each floor's boss: Pepperman, an anthropomorphic red bell pepper and self-absorbed artist; The Vigilante, a bounty-hunting cowboy made of melted cheese; The Noise (a parody of The Noid), a TV host and Peppino's fiercest rival; and Fake Peppino, an uncanny body horror clone of Peppino.

Eventually, Peppino reaches the top of the tower and confronts Pizzaface, only to learn that he is actually a machine operated by Pizzahead, an impish trickster with a pizza slice for a head and a clown-like face, owner of a failed pizzeria, and Peppino's past enemy. Peppino defeats Pizzahead, as well as the other bosses when they return in a boss rush; however, with Pizzahead's defeat and the destruction of the original Pillar John, the tower begins to crumble. Peppino flees back down each floor to escape the tower, rescuing Gustavo, Brick, Gerome, Mort the Chicken, and Mr. Stick, as well as Pepperman, The Vigilante, The Noise, and Fake Peppino along the way.

Peppino and the group escape the tower just as it collapses. Depending on whether all of the treasures were collected, Pillar John may either die in the collapse, or Peppino may revive Pillar John, allowing him to take revenge on Pizzahead. Regardless of which ending the player achieves, Peppino returns to running Peppino Pizza, with a new customer base and enough money to remain afloat.

Development 
Before Pizza Tower was conceptualized, McPig, one of the developers from Tour De Pizza, thought about making a horror-themed comic series about a deranged chef who fought pizza demons in his own restaurant, citing Courage the Cowardly Dog as inspiration.

Pizza Tower began development around 2018, going through many different concepts, revisions, and demo builds over 5 years of development. Development was supported through Tour De Pizza's Patreon. McPig was the project's only artist and coder; ClascyJitto/Frostix and Mr. Sauceman were the game's primary composers. The main menu theme was composed by PostElvis, while Jack Knife and Kyoobot were featured on "Pizza Mayhem", the game's unused theme song featured as a bonus track on the official soundtrack.

Mr. Sauceman, real name Ronan de Castel, had only viewed composing as "basically a hobby" and sent McPig an early version of "It's Pizza Time!", the theme used in the Pizza Time escape phase and a leitmotif in other tracks, initially not expecting to hear anything back; the Pizza Tower soundtrack ultimately became his first published work.

Featured as a transformation in the level "Fun Farm" is Mort, a chicken that is the protagonist of the 2000 PlayStation game Mort the Chicken. Ed Annunziata, the creator of the character, gave Tour De Pizza permission for Mort to be used in the game.

A cooperative mode featuring The Noise as a playable character was planned in development, and was featured in previous demo builds, but did not make it into the final release. The Noise is slated to be added in a future update to the main game.

Reception 

Pizza Tower received "generally favorable" reviews, according to review aggregator Metacritic.

Scott McCrae of PC Gamer gave the game a 90 out of 100%, praising its Wario Land-inspired level design, soundtrack, and wacky, absurd nature, writing "Pizza Tower is an unashamed ode to Wario Land—but in my eyes, it has eclipsed it." Will Nelson of PCGamesN highlighted the game's visuals and soundtrack, and noted "it’s already shot up to the top of my must-play list." Matthew Byrd of Den of Geek highlighted the game's aesthetic, noting its "90s Nickelodeon-style visuals and humor". Patrick Gill of Polygon recommended the game, stating it perfected its niche genre. Esquire named Pizza Tower one of the best games of 2023.

Rock Paper Shotgun, PixelDie, Game Chronicles, WayTooManyGames, The Game Hoard, The Webster Journal, and Multiplayer.it also gave Pizza Tower positive reviews.

References 

2023 video games
Indie video games
Single-player video games
Video games about food and drink
Video games developed in Canada
Video games set in castles
Platform games
Side-scrolling platform games
Windows games
Windows-only games